Waipori may refer to either:
Waipori, New Zealand, a township within Dunedin, New Zealand's city limits
 The Waipori River in Otago in the South Island of New Zealand, or to
 Lake Waipori, an area of wetlands draining into the Waipori River 
SS Waipori, a Union Company cargo ship